Michael Andrew Fisher (born June 5, 1980) is a Canadian former professional ice hockey centre who played for the Ottawa Senators and Nashville Predators in the National Hockey League (NHL). He was drafted by the Senators in the second round, 44th overall, in the 1998 NHL Entry Draft.

Playing career

Junior
Fisher grew up playing hockey in the Peterborough Minor Hockey Association (OMHA) with the rep Minor Petes program. He was drafted from Jr. A Peterborough Petes (OHA) by the Sudbury Wolves in the second round, 22nd overall, in the 1997 OHL Priority Draft. After putting up 49 points in 66 games in his first year with the Wolves, Fisher was drafted in the second round, 44th overall, by the Ottawa Senators in the 1998 NHL Entry Draft. Returning to the OHL for one more season, Fisher recorded 106 points, fifth overall in league scoring.

Ottawa Senators
Fisher debuted with the Senators in 1999–2000 and recorded 9 points in an injury-shortened 32-game rookie season. He became known for his aggressive style of play and began to also show his penchant for offensive production as he improved to 18 goals and 38 points in his fourth season in 2002–03.

During the lock-out year of 2004–05, Fisher played overseas for EV Zug in the Swiss Nationalliga A. As NHL play resumed the next season, in 2005–06, Fisher emerged with 22 goals and 44 points, providing valuable secondary scoring for the Spezza-Heatley-Alfredsson line. He helped the Senators to a first seed in the Eastern Conference going into the playoffs, but they were defeated by the fourth-seeded division rivals Buffalo Sabres in five games in the second round. With a career-high plus-minus (+/-) rating of +23 in the regular season, Fisher was nominated for the Frank J. Selke Trophy as the best defensive forward. He finished as second runner-up behind Jere Lehtinen of the Dallas Stars and trophy-winner Rod Brind'Amour, captain of the Stanley Cup champion Carolina Hurricanes.

The following season, Fisher duplicated his previous campaign's goals total with 22 and improved to a personal best 26 assists and 48 points. He was kept to 68 games due to a left knee injury, sustained on December 27, 2006, against the New York Islanders, forcing him to sit out four weeks. In the playoffs, Fisher helped the Senators to the 2007 Stanley Cup Finals, where they fell short to the Anaheim Ducks in five games. Fisher posted career playoff highs with 5 goals, 5 assists and 10 points in 20 games.

With one year left on his contract heading into the 2007–08 season, Fisher re-signed with the Senators to a five-year, $21 million contract extension. He went on to set a career-high 23 goals that season. However, Fisher was forced to miss the playoffs, injuring his left knee in a knee-on-knee hit from Toronto Maple Leafs forward Mark Bell in the final game of the regular season.
 
A month and a half into the 2008–09 season, Fisher suffered another knee injury, straining a ligament in his right knee against the New York Islanders on November 17, 2008.

Nashville Predators
On February 10, 2011, Fisher was traded to the Nashville Predators in exchange for the Predators' 2011 first round draft pick (Stefan Noesen) and a conditional pick in 2012 (Jarrod Maidens). The condition was that should the Predators win a playoff series, the Senators would receive a third-round pick, and a second round pick if the Predators won two or more playoff series. The Predators won their first round playoff but ultimately lost their second round series, to the Vancouver Canucks, meaning the Senators received a third-round pick. According to Fisher, although there were many trade deals for him, Ottawa GM Bryan Murray and Ottawa owner Eugene Melnyk had chosen to accept Nashville's offer so that Fisher could be closer to his wife, country singer Carrie Underwood.

Fisher played his first game with the Predators on February 12, 2011, and scored an assist in a 5–3 win over the Colorado Avalanche. He scored his first goal as a Predator five days later, on February 17, against the Vancouver Canucks.

Fisher was the winner of the 2012 NHL Foundation Player Award, awarded to the NHL player who applies the core values of hockey – commitment, perseverance and teamwork – to enrich the lives of people in his community.

On June 26, 2015, just prior to becoming an unrestricted free agent on July 1, Fisher signed a two-year, $8.8 million contract extension with the Predators, paying $4.8 million in 2015–16 and $4 million in 2016–17.

On May 5, 2016, he scored with 8:48 left in triple overtime in game four of the Western Conference Semi-finals to beat the San Jose Sharks 4–3, tying the series at two games apiece.

On September 7, 2016, Fisher was named the sixth captain of the Predators after previous captain Shea Weber was traded to the Montreal Canadiens for defenseman P. K. Subban. He led the Predators to the 2017 Stanley Cup Finals eventually losing to the Pittsburgh Penguins in six games. On August 3, 2017, Fisher announced his retirement from the NHL via a letter addressed to Predators fans in that day's edition of The Tennessean, becoming the first Predators captain to retire with the team.

On January 31, 2018, Fisher announced that he intended to end his retirement to help the Predators make another Stanley Cup run. Fisher said that he would practice with the Predators and eventually sign a contract before the trade deadline of February 26, 2018. On February 26, 2018, Fisher signed a one-year contract with the Predators.

Fisher retired for a second time on May 12, 2018, a few days after the Predators were eliminated in the second round of the playoffs by the Winnipeg Jets.

Personal life
Fisher was born and raised in Peterborough, Ontario, to parents Jim and Karen and is a devout Christian. He has two brothers (Rob and Gregory, aka "Bud") and one sister (Meredith). Fisher's uncle is David Fisher, a former chaplain to the Toronto Blue Jays baseball club. Fisher's brother Gregory is also a hockey player; he is a goaltender who played for Quinnipiac University in the ECAC. On October 23, 2009, Gregory replaced the Senators' then-starting goaltender Pascal Leclaire in net during a Senators' practice after Leclaire fell ill.

In the off-season, Fisher devotes time to hockey camps in his hometown in Peterborough, Kingston and Ottawa through Hockey Ministries International. Fisher has also been a guest instructor at the Roger Neilson Hockey Camp.

Fisher is married to American singer Carrie Underwood. They met backstage after one of Underwood's concerts in 2008. The couple became engaged on December 20, 2009. On July 10, 2010, Fisher married Underwood at The Ritz-Carlton Lodge, Reynolds Plantation, in Greensboro, Georgia, with more than 250 people in attendance. Underwood surprised Fisher by having one of their favorite artists, Brandon Heath, sing his song "Love Never Fails" for their first dance. It was announced on September 1, 2014, that Fisher and Underwood were expecting their first child together. In February 2015, Underwood gave birth to their first child, a son. In January 2019, she gave birth to their second son. The family currently lives in Franklin, Tennessee.

On March 21, 2019, Fisher became a United States citizen.

Career statistics

Regular season and playoffs

International

References

External links

 
 

1980 births
Canadian Christians
Canadian emigrants to the United States
Canadian ice hockey centres
Ice hockey people from Ontario
Living people
Nashville Predators players
Ottawa Senators draft picks
Ottawa Senators players
People with acquired American citizenship
Sportspeople from Peterborough, Ontario
Sudbury Wolves players
Canadian expatriate ice hockey players in the United States